Bates Gill is an expert on Chinese foreign policy and a former Director of the Stockholm International Peace Research Institute (SIPRI).

Gill has a long record of research and publication on both international and regional security issues. These include arms control, non-proliferation, peacekeeping and military-technical development—and all mainly with regard to China and the Asia-Pacific region. In recent years his work has broadened to encompass other contemporary security-related trends including multilateral security organizations, the impact of domestic politics and development on the foreign policies of states, and the nexus of public health and security. Currently, his work focuses on Chinese foreign and security policy, U.S.-China relations, and the U.S. role in Asia.

Education
Gill received his Ph.D in foreign affairs from the Woodrow Wilson Department of Government and Foreign Affairs at the University of Virginia, Charlottesville in 1991. His thesis investigated the relationship between Chinese arms transfers and the country's foreign policy, and was entitled "Fire of the Dragon: Arms Transfers in Chinese Security Policy". He received his B.A from Albion College, Michigan with a double major in political science and French. He speaks, reads and writes Chinese, English, and French.

Professional life
He is currently a professor with the Department of Security Studies at Macquarie University and a senior associate fellow with the Royal United Services Institute (RUSI) in London. He was previously the chief executive officer of the United States Studies Centre at the University of Sydney (2012–2015). Prior to this, he was Director of the Stockholm International Peace Research Institute (SIPRI)(2007-2012). Before being named SIPRI Director in 2007, Gill held the Freeman Chair in China Studies at the Center for Strategic and International Studies (CSIS) in Washington, D.C. from 2002. He served as a Senior Fellow in Foreign Policy Studies and inaugural Director of the Center for Northeast Asian Policy Studies at the Brookings Institution in Washington, D.C., from 1998 to 2002.

Before his work at Brookings, Gill's previous assignments included directing East Asia programmes at the Center for Nonproliferation Studies of the Monterey Institute of International Studies in Monterey, California (U.S.). He also held the Fei Yiming Chair in Comparative Politics.

Selected works

Books
Gill is author, co-author or editor of nine books:

 China Matters: Getting it Right for Australia (Black Inc./La Trobe University Press, 2017), co-authored with Linda Jakobson
 Governing the Bomb: Civilian Control and Democratic Accountability of Nuclear Weapons (Oxford University Press, 2010), co-edited with Hans Born and Heiner Hänggi
 Asia's New Multilateralism: Cooperation, Competition, and the Search for Community (Columbia University Press, 2009), co-edited with Michael J. Green
 Rising Star: China's New Security Diplomacy (Brookings Institution Press, 2007, revised edition in 2010, published in Japanese in 2014)
 China: The Balance Sheet: What the World Needs to Know Now about the Emerging Superpower (PublicAffairs, 2006), co-authored with C. Fred Bergsten, Nicholas Lardy, and Derek Mitchell
 Weathering the Storm: Taiwan, Its Neighbors and the Asian Financial Crisis (Brookings Institution Press, 2000), co-edited with Peter Chow
 China’s Arms Acquisitions from Abroad: A Quest for ‘Superb and Secret Weapons’ (Oxford: Oxford University Press, 1995), co-authored with Taeho Kim
 Arms, Transparency and Security in Southeast Asia (Oxford University Press, 1997), co-edited with J. N. Mak
 Chinese Arms Transfers (Praeger Publishers, 1992)

He was also the publisher of the SIPRI Yearbook during his tenure as SIPRI Director.

References

External links
SIPRI Biography: Dr Bates Gill
Bates Gill | Foreign Affairs (Author Profile)
China's Space Odyssey: What the Antisatellite Test Reveals About Decision-Making in Beijing - Foreign Affairs, May/June 2007
China's HIV Crisis - Foreign Affairs, March/April 2002
Limited Engagement - Foreign Affairs, July/August 1999

American political scientists
Living people
Year of birth missing (living people)
Albion College alumni
University of Virginia alumni
Academic staff of the University of Sydney
Academic staff of Macquarie University